RaShaun Allen (born February 25, 1990) is an American football tight end who is currently a free agent. He played college football at Southern University and attended John Adams High School in Cleveland, Ohio. He has been a member of the Seattle Seahawks, Minnesota Vikings, New Orleans Saints, Pittsburgh Steelers, and Houston Texans.

Early years
Allen played high school football for the John Adams High School Rebels, graduating in 2009. He helped the Rebels to an 8–2 record in his senior year and was named was honorable mention all-district.

College career
Allen played for the Southern Jaguars from 2010 to 2013.

Professional career

Seattle Seahawks
Allen signed with the Seattle Seahawks on May 19, 2014 after going undrafted in the 2014 NFL Draft. He was released by the Seahawks on August 30 and signed to the team's practice squad on August 31, 2014. He made his NFL debut on October 19, 2014 against the St. Louis Rams. He was waived on October 21, 2014, but re-signed to the team's practice squad on October 23, 2014. Allen was released by the Seahawks on October 30, 2014.

Minnesota Vikings
Allen was signed to the Minnesota Vikings' practice squad on November 3, 2014.

Seattle Seahawks
Allen was signed by the Seattle Seahawks off the Vikings practice squad on November 11, 2014. He was released by the Seahawks on December 20, 2014. He was signed to the Seahawks' practice squad on December 23, 2014. Allen was released by the Seahawks on September 5, 2015 and signed to the team's practice squad on September 6, 2015. He was released by the Seahawks on November 3, 2015.

New Orleans Saints
On November 10, 2015, Allen was signed to the New Orleans Saints' practice squad. On December 30, 2015, he was signed to the Saints' active roster. He was released by the team on August 30, 2016.

Pittsburgh Steelers
Allen was signed to the Pittsburgh Steelers' practice squad on September 4, 2016. He was released by the Steelers on October 25, 2016.

Houston Texans
On September 7, Allen was signed to the Houston Texans' practice squad. He signed a reserve/future contract with the Texans on January 16, 2017. Allen was waived/injured by the Texans on September 2, 2017, and placed on injured reserve the next day. On September 7, 2017, he was waived after agreeing to an injury settlement.

References

Living people
1990 births
American football tight ends
African-American players of American football
Southern Jaguars football players
Seattle Seahawks players
Minnesota Vikings players
New Orleans Saints players
Pittsburgh Steelers players
Houston Texans players
Players of American football from Cleveland
John Adams High School (Ohio) alumni
21st-century African-American sportspeople